Katra is a town in the Reasi district of the Indian union territory of Jammu and Kashmir, situated at the foot of the Trikuta Mountains, where the shrine of Vaishno Devi is located.

Geography 

It has an average elevation of 875 metres (2,474 feet). The Banganga River passes through the village.

There have also been reports of possible oil reserves in the area

Climate

Demographics

As of 2011 Indian Census, Katra had a total population of 9,008, of which 5,106 were males and 3,902 were females. The population within the age group of 0 to 6 years was 1,012. The total number of literates in Katra was 6,841, which constituted 75.9% of the population with male literacy of 79.4% and female literacy of 71.4%. The effective literacy rate of the 7+ population of Katra was 85.6%, of which the male literacy rate was 89.2% and the female literacy rate was 80.8%. The Scheduled Castes and Scheduled Tribes population was 1,925 and 9 respectively. Katra had 1594  households in 2011.

Languages
As per the 2011 census, the majority, 78.2% of the population spoke Dogri, followed by 10.6% Hindi, 2.5% Punjabi, 2.2% Assamese, and 1.4% Kashmiri speakers.

Tourism

Katra serves as the base camp for pilgrims who visit Vaishno Devi. It has hotels, guest houses, restaurants, and dhabas. Free accommodation is also provided by some registered trusts in the form of sarais for the poor. The number of pilgrims who visit the shrine every year has increased from 1.4 million in 1986 to 8.2 million in 2009. A bazaar sells  souvenirs, dry fruit, woolen garments, hosiery, and leather jackets. To reach Vaishno Devi, pilgrims register at Katra before starting the trek, and by registering, the pilgrims get accident insurance up to 100,000 INR while on the trek of 14 km. There is another trek of 2.5 km from Vaishno Devi temple to Baba Bhaironnath. Electric vehicles and helicopter services are available for pilgrims. A new ropeway system has just been inaugurated from the Vaishno Devi Bhawan to the Bhairon Baba Mandir, reducing the journey to time to just 3 minutes. The ropeway can carry 800 people every hour.

Transport

Road
Katra is well-connected by roads with other places in Jammu and Kashmir and India. The NH 144 passes through Katra. Presently, it takes around 12 hours to travel from New Delhi to Katra. The planned Delhi–Amritsar–Katra Expressway will shorten the duration to 7 hours.

Rail
The Jammu–Baramulla line connects the Katra Railway Station of Northern Railways to the rest of the Indian railways' network. It was inaugurated by Indian Prime Minister Sri Narendra Modi on 4 July 2014.

Air
The nearest airport to Katra is Jammu Airport located at a distance of 50 kilometres. There are numerous helipads in and around Katra which have service to the Vaishno Devi Temple.

References

External links

 All Trains at Shri Mata Vaishno Devi Katra Railway Station
 Official website of the Shri Mata Vaishno Devi Shrine Board

 
Cities and towns in Reasi district